Balinale, also known as the Bali International Film Festival, is a non-profit, non-government foundation that was established in 2007. It aims to provide a global audience to Indonesian film makers, as well as to entice foreign film-makers to feature Indonesia in their films. Through this, several places have become shooting locations for Hollywood movies such as Eat Pray Love by Ryan Murphy, Born To Be Wild by David Lickley, Savages by Oliver Stone and Alex Cross by Rob Cohen.

Balinale is recognized internationally for the diversity of its programming consisting of Indonesian and international independent and award-winning fiction, documentary, feature and short films, it is also credited for the quality of the associated events where filmmakers enjoy Balinale's relaxed and familiar manner informally meeting to discuss films, trends and the demands of a growing fast-paced industry.

History
Balinale was established in 2007 by Bali Taksu Indonesia, a non-profit and non-government organization and Bali Film Center. The festival's vision is to invite filmmakers from abroad to show their films and introduce the beautiful nature and culture of Indonesia. It also works towards developing understanding and respect for freedom of expression, human rights and intellectual property rights and fosters cross-cultural respect and tolerance through filmmaking workshops, seminars and community programs to include an open-air cinema (Layar Tancap). Balinale is recognized internationally for the quality and diversity of its programming. Balinale is affiliated with Motion Picture Association, Asia Pacific Screen Awards (Brisbane, Australia), ASEAN International Film Festival & Awards (Kuching, Malaysia), Asian Film Commissions Network and supporting American Film Showcase and Sundance Institute's Film Forward.

References

Film festivals in Indonesia
Bali